Rushere Community Hospital, is a non-profit community hospital in the Western Region of Uganda. It is affiliated with the Church of Uganda.

Location
The geographical coordinates of Rushere Community Hospital are: 0°12'35.0"S, 30°56'53.0"E (Latitude:-0.209722; Longitude:30.948056).

History
Rushere Community Hospital was established in 1992, out of a clinic that was founded in 1988. It is managed by the Uganda Protestant Medical Bureau, since 1998. In 2005, it was designated as a district hospital for Kiruhura District, after signing a memorandum of understanding with the Uganda Ministry of Health.

Overview
The hospital sits on a piece of real estate that measures . It has bed capacity of 102. It is funded by donations from individuals and institutions from within and outside Uganda. Rushere Community Hospital also receives financial and other assistance from the government of Uganda. As of November 2020, the hospital had 75 members of staff.

Rushere Community Hospital is a private interdenominational Christian, non-profit institution that serves people without regard to age, skin color, nationality, gender or creed. As of November 2020, the hospital maintains the following departments, among others: 1. Out Patient Department 2. HIV Centre 3. Laboratory 4. Pediatric Ward 5. General Ward 6. Private Ward 7. Operating Theatre and 8. Maternity Ward.

References

External links
 Website of Rushere Community Hospital
 Mobile medical camp improves lives in Rushere As of 17 December 2019.

Hospitals established in 1992
Rushere
Kiruhura District
Ankole sub-region
Western Region, Uganda
1992 establishments in Uganda